Netball at the 1991 South Pacific Games in Santa Rita, Guam was held from 25 August to 5 September 1995.

This was the seventh competition at the South Pacific Games for netball. The winner of the event were the Fiji over the Papua New Guinea. Tonga took the bronze.

Final standings

See also
 Netball at the Pacific Games

References

1995 Pacific Games
South Pacific Games
Netball at the Pacific Games